Oulu Airport is located in Oulu, Finland,  south-west of the city centre. The airport is the second busiest in Finland after Helsinki-Vantaa Airport, as measured by the number of passengers (ca. 1.1 million in 2018). There are around 20 daily flights to Helsinki. Oulu Airport is also extensively used by the Finnish Air Force for training purposes and the managing body of the airport is Finavia. Oulu Airport has offered free wireless network access for passengers since May 2007.

History 

The construction of the airport runways in Oulunsalo began in 1949 and was completed in 1953 after the previous airport in Oritkari became too outdated for modern aircraft. In 1953 the airport only consisted of gravel runways and it wasn't until 1958 that the terminal and ATC building were built and the runways were paved. Finnair back then "Aero" operated routes from the airport with DC-3 aircraft and started flights with Sud Aviation Caravelle jets from Oulu in 1964. The current terminal building was built to replace the old one in 1973 and expanded/renovated in 2002 and 2011 with the old one being demolished in the fall of 2005. The second runway of the airport was removed in the early 2000s and the current ATC tower was built in 1998.

Facilities

Terminal

The old terminal of the airport was demolished in 2005 for more apron space and a major extension of the main terminal was completed in September 2011. The terminal has three cafes, one before security and two in the gate area which also has a bar "Oluthuone Toppila" and a duty-free shop. There's also a designated smoking area and a grand piano that can be played by visitors.

Runway
Runway 12 is equipped with Category II Instrument landing system. The runway was renewed in summer 2017.

Airlines and destinations 
The following airlines operate regular scheduled and charter flights at Oulu Airport:

Statistics

Ground transportation

Incidents and accidents
Finnair Flight 405 was hijacked from Oulu on September 30, 1978. The Hijacking was resolved without any injuries or fatalities and the hijacker, 37-year-old Aarno Lamminparras was arrested at his home in Oulu the next day after he had received his ransom demands. A Finnish movie The Hijack That Went South is based on the events of the hijacking by Lamminparras.

See also 
List of the largest airports in the Nordic countries

References

External links 
 
 
 AIP Finland – Oulu Airport
 
 

Airports in Finland
Airport
Airport
International airports in Finland